Tricholamia plagiata is a species of beetle in the family Cerambycidae. It was described by Henry Walter Bates in 1884. It is known from the Democratic Republic of the Congo, Cameroon, Tanzania, and Ghana.

References

Lamiini
Beetles described in 1884